Edward Knight is the name of:

 Edward Knight (American actor) (1927–2009), American actor
 Edward Knight (composer) (born 1961), American composer
 Edward Knight (cricketer) (1794–1879), English amateur cricketer
 Edward Knight (English actor) (1774–1826), known as "Little Knight"
 Edward Knight (King's Men) (fl. 1613–1637), English theatrical prompter
 Edward Austen Knight (1768–1852), brother of Jane Austen, and High Sheriff of Kent in 1801
 Edward Frederick Knight (1852–1925), writer and yachtsman
 Edward H. Knight (1824–1883), American mechanical expert
 Edward J. Knight (1864–1908), bishop of the Episcopal Diocese of Western Colorado

See also
Ted Knight (disambiguation)